Darah may refer to:

Films 

 Macabre, a 2009 Indonesian film also known as Darah or Rumah Dara

Places 
 Darah, India, a village in Madhepur block, Madhubani District, Bihar
 Darah, Iran, a village in Zonuzaq Rural District, in the Central District of Marand County, East Azerbaijan Province, Iran
 Darah, Pakistan, a village in Khyber Pakhtunkhwa province of Pakistan
 Darah District, Panjshir Province, Afghanistan